Anbangbang Billabong lies in the shadow of Nourlangie Rock within Kakadu National Park and is a good place to view a wide range of wildlife. Large numbers of water fowl and wading birds inhabit the billabong and many wallabies can be found grazing around the water's edge. There is a walking trail around the circumference of Anbangbang Billabong with many picnic areas.

Geography 

The Anbangbang Billabong is overlooked by the Nawurlandja and Nourlangie plateaus. In the wet season, it is fed by runoff from these plateaus, as well as overflow from Nourlangie Creek, however during the dry season it is cut off.

Fauna 

Like much of Kakadu, Anbangbang Billabong is home to a particularly large variety of bird life. The fluctuating water levels draw waterfowl such as magpie geese, pelicans, darters, spoonbills and brolga. Other fauna known to frequent the billabong include wallabies, file snakes, long-necked turtles, dingoes and goannas.

Mangroves lining the billabong support populations of freshwater mussel. Adjacent woodlands play host to a different ecosystem again. The nearby Nawurlandja plateau supports local populations of short-eared rock-wallaby and chestnut-quilled rock pigeon, among other species.

Flora 

The swelling billabong promotes seasonal growth of sedges, grasses, water lilies, and freshwater mangrove line the water's edge. Swamp areas support many types of paperbark, in particular the weeping paperbark, silver-leaved paperbark and broad-leaved paperbark.

The woodlands surrounding the billabong are a lush habitat comprising an abundance of plant species. Darwin woollybutt and Darwin stringybark dominate, with large populations of fan palms, kapok, red apples, wattle and Pandanus.

Climate 

Like much of Kakadu, the Anbangbang Billabong region's climate is monsoonal. The region's aboriginal owners recognize six seasons, however these can be reduced to vastly differing dry and wet seasons where the billabong is respectively depleted and replenished.

Tourism 

Anbangbang Billabong has a marked, 2.5 km circular walk, popular with tourists to Kakadu National Park, but accessible only during the dry season. It is a hotspot for bird watching during the late dry and early wet seasons due to the abundance of birdlife. The nearby Nourlangie plateau and Anbangbang shelter are of particular interest for their aboriginal rock art and 20,000 year old history.

Aboriginal beliefs 

A local creation story tells that the Anbangbang Billabong was formed by a pair of short-eared rock wallabies, or badbong, who are responsible for cutting the rock and parting the trees to form the current landscape.

Etymology 

The name 'Anbangbang' has no known meaning.

See also
 Plants Kakadu National Park
 Kakadu plum
 Nourlangie Rock
 Bininj

References

External links

Aboriginal Art Lear more about Aboriginal culture in Kakadu
 Google Map Map of Kakadu National Park including art sites

Kakadu National Park